The Columbus Buckeyes were a professional baseball team that played in the American Association for two seasons from 1883 to 1884. The franchise used Recreation Park I as their home field. During their two seasons of existence, the team had a record of 101–104.

Players

References

External links
Franchise index at Baseball-Reference and Retrosheet

Major League Baseball all-time rosters